Mzé Abdou Soulé Elbak (born 1954) was president of the autonomous island of Grande Comore in the Comoros from 2002 to 2007.

References

1954 births
Comorian politicians
Living people
People from Grande Comore